Choanotaenia is a genus of flatworms belonging to the family Dilepididae.

The genus has cosmopolitan distribution.

Species:

Choanotaenia cylindrocephala 
Choanotaenia didiplogona 
Choanotaenia estavarensis 
Choanotaenia fortunata 
Choanotaenia ibanezi 
Choanotaenia infundibuliformis 
Choanotaenia infundibulum 
Choanotaenia littoriae 
Choanotaenia microphallos 
Choanotaenia mollis 
Choanotaenia orioli 
Choanotaenia passerellae 
Choanotaenia pirinica 
Choanotaenia platycephala 
Choanotaenia plegadis 
Choanotaenia polyorchis 
Choanotaenia rostrata 
Choanotaenia scythica 
Choanotaenia soricina 
Choanotaenia strigium 
Choanotaenia sylvarum 
Choanotaenia thraciensis 
Choanotaenia trapezoides 
Choanotaenia tubirostellata 
Choanotaenia uncinata

References

Cestoda